Andoque is a language spoken by a few hundred Andoque people in Colombia, and is in decline.  There were 10,000 speakers in 1908, down to 370 a century later, of which at most 50 are monolingual.  The remaining speakers live in the area of the Anduche River, downstream from Araracuara, Solano, Caquetá, Colombia; the language is no longer spoken in Peru. Most speakers shifted to Spanish.

Classification
Andoque may be related to the extinct Urequena language (also Urekena or Arequena) which is known only from a single 19th century wordlist.

Kaufman's (2007) Bora–Witótoan stock includes Andoque in the Witótoan family, but other linguists, such as Richard Aschmann, consider Andoque an isolate.

Phonology 
Andoque has been analyzed to have the lowest consonant-to-vowel ratio of any language in the world, with ten consonants and nine vowel qualities. However, other studies (see below) have reported other numbers of consonants and vowels.

Vowels

Landaburu (2000) reports nine oral vowels and six nasal vowels.

Consonants

Tone 
Andoque vowels have one of two phonological tones, low or high, with the low tone being far more frequent. Landaburu (2000) marks high tone vowels with a tilde and leaves low tone vowels unmarked. While some lexemes are distinct only in tone (such as -ka- 'mix' and -ká- 'distribute'), Landaburu notes that many grammatical distinctions are made solely through differences in tone, as in the examples below which differ in tense.

Grammar

Classifiers 
The subject noun does not appear alone, but is accompanied by markers for gender or noun classifiers (which are determined by shape). These noun classifiers are as follows:

Person markers include o- ("I"), ha- ("you (singular)"), ka- ("we") and kə- ("you (plural)").

The adjectival or verbal predicate has a suffix which agrees with the subject: -ʌ for animate subjects and flexible or hollow ones; -ó for rigid or elongated ones; -i for others. Adjectival and verbal predicates are also marked with prefixes indicating mood, direction or aspect, and infixes for tense. The nominal predicate (What something is) does not have a suffix of agreement nor a dynamic prefix, but it can take infixes for tense and mood, like the verb. Other grammatical roles (benefactive, instrumental, locative) appear outside the verb in the form of markers for case. There are 11 case suffixes.

Evidentials 
In addition, the sentence has markers for the source of knowledge, or evidentials indicating whether the speaker knows the information communicated firsthand, heard it from another person, has deduced it, etc.

There is also a focus marker -nokó, which draws attention to the participants or indicates the highlight of a story. In the language there are means of representing action from the point of view of the subject or other participants, or from the point of view of an external observer.

Vocabulary

Landaburu (2000)
Landaburu (2000) gives the following Swadesh list table for Andoque:

{| class="wikitable sortable"
! no. !! Spanish gloss !! English gloss !! Andoque
|-
| 1. || yo || I || o-ʔɤ
|-
| 2. || tú || you || ha-ʔɤ
|-
| 3. || nosotros || we || kẽ-ʔɤ̃
|-
| 4. || ésto || this || ʌɲẽ́
|-
| 5. || hoja || leaf || -sedɤ̃
|-
| 6. || aquel || that || ʌdí
|-
| 7. || ¿quién? || who? || kó-i
|-
| 8. || ¿qué? || what? || hi-ʌ
|-
| g. || no || not || hʌ́ʌ-bã́
|-
| 10. || todos || all || sí-õ-kɤ̃
|-
| 11. || muchos || many || hʌ́ʌ-pãã́, ɯ́ɯ-kɤ̃
|-
| 12. || largo || one || bɤ̃kɤ̃-
|-
| 13. || uno || two || ʌisidé
|-
| 14. || dos || big || ʌ-ʌ́hʌbã́
|-
| 15. || grande || long || ĩʔõ-kɤ̃
|-
| 16. || perro || dog || ĩɲõ
|-
| 17. || chico || small || uʔ-pãã́-ɲé-ʌ
|-
| 18. || mujer || woman || tiʔi
|-
| 19. || hombre || person || ʝóʔhʌ
|-
| 20. || pescado || fish || bei
|-
| 21. || pájaro || bird || hiʌɸo
|-
| 22. || piojo || louse || táʔsi
|-
| 23. || cola || tail || -dɤ̃ta
|-
| 24. || árbol || tree || kɤ̃́ʔɤ̃dɤ
|-
| 25. || semilla || seed || -tapi
|-
| 26. || raíz || root || -ɲeko
|-
| 27. || corteza || bark || -tasi
|-
| 28. || piel || skin || -tasi
|-
| 29. || carne || flesh || -ɤ̃ta
|-
| 30. || sangre || blood || -duʔs
|-
| 31. || hueso || bone || -tadɤ̃
|-
| 32. || grasa || grease || kẽɤ̃i
|-
| 33. || huevo || egg || -hádɤ
|-
| 34. || cuerno || horn || -si
|-
| 35. || pluma || feather || -ɲeɸʌ
|-
| 36. || parado || standing || taɲe-
|-
| 37. || cabello || hair || ka-tai ʌka-be
|-
| 38. || cabeza || head || -tai
|-
| 39. || oreja || ear || -bei
|-
| 40. || ojo || eye || -ʔákʌ
|-
| 41. || nariz || nose || -pɤta
|-
| 42. || boca || mouth || -ɸi
|-
| 43. || diente || tooth || -kódi
|-
| 44. || lengua || tongue || -sodɤ̃
|-
| 45. || rodilla || knee || -kodoi
|-
| 46. || garra, uña || claw, nail || -sikopɤ
|-
| 47. || pie || foot || -dʌka
|-
| 48. || mano || hand || -dobi
|-
| 49. || barriga || belly || -tura
|-
| 50. || cuello || neck || -ɲekɤ̃́i
|-
| 51. || senos || breasts || -ɲeé
|-
| 52. || corazón || heart || -pĩ́tú
|-
| 53. || hígado || liver || -tú
|-
| 54. || beber || drink || -kóʔ-
|-
| 55. || comer || eat || -baʔi-
|-
| 56. || morder || bite || -ʝu-
|-
| 57. || ver || see || -do-
|-
| 58. || oir || hear || -tó-
|-
| 59. || saber || know || -do-
|-
| 60. || dormir || sleep || -pʌ-
|-
| 61. || morir || die || ĩ-hʌ́ʌ-
|-
| 62. || matar || kill || -buʔ-
|-
| 63. || nadar || swim || -ɲṍẽi-
|-
| 64. || volar || fly || -bu-
|-
| 65. || andar, caminar || walk || -tá-
|-
| 66. || venir || come || da-ɤ̃-
|-
| 67. || acostado || lying down || se-aɲe-
|-
| 68. || dar || give || -ĩ-
|-
| 69. || sentado || seated || ʝi-ɸɤʌ́-aɲe-
|-
| 70. || decir || say || -kɤ̃-/-ẽʔ-
|-
| 71. || sol || sun || ĩɒ̃
|-
| 72. || luna || moon || pódɤɤ̃
|-
| 73 || estrella || star || ɸʌʔko
|-
| 74. || agua || water || dúʔu
|-
| 75 || lluvia || rain || dɤ-i
|-
| 76. || piedra || stone || ɸisi
|-
| 77. || arena || sand || poʔsɒ̃ɤ̃
|-
| 78. || tierra || earth || ɲṍʔĩ
|-
| 79. || nube || cloud || bóasiakʌi dɤ̃kɤ̃
|-
| 80. || humo || smoke || bóasiakʌi
|-
| 81. || fuego || fire || ʌʔpa
|-
| 82. || ceniza || ashes || pʌtakoi
|-
| 83. || arder || burn || -du-
|-
| 84. || camino || path || dubɤ, õbɤ
|-
| 85. || cerro || mountain || toʌ́i
|-
| 86. || rojo || red || peo-
|-
| 87. || verde || green || paʝo-
|-
| 88. || amarillo || yellow || dóɒ-
|-
| 89. || blanco || white || poʔté
|-
| 90. || negro || black || uo-
|-
| 91. || noche || night || hʌʔpʌ́ʌ
|-
| 92. || caliente || hot || pã-
|-
| 93. || frio || cold || dõsi-ko-
|-
| 94. || lleno || full || ɸiʔ
|-
| 95. || nuevo || new || pá-
|-
| 96. || bueno || good || ɸɤɲe-
|-
| 97. || redondo || round || -tude 'bola' ("ball")
|-
| 98. || seco || dry || ʝɒʔɒ-
|-
| 99. || nombre || name || -ti
|}

Loukotka (1968)
Loukotka (1968) lists the following basic vocabulary items for Andoque.

{| 
! gloss !! Andoque
|-
| one || itsidixate
|-
| two || ükhümá
|-
| head || ka-tái
|-
| eye || ka-haksü
|-
| tooth || ka-koːné
|-
| man || phohaː
|-
| water || dzühü
|-
| fire || nóhapa
|-
| maize || tsobohi
|-
| jaguar || inóh
|-
| house || dzyaʔpüko
|}

Notes

Bibliography
 Aschmann, Richard P. (1993). Proto Witotoan. Publications in linguistics (No. 114). Arlington, TX: SIL & the University of Texas at Arlington.
 Campbell, Lyle. (1997). American Indian languages: The historical linguistics of Native America. New York: Oxford University Press. .
 Greenberg, Joseph H. (1987). Language in the Americas. Stanford: Stanford University Press.
 Kaufman, Terrence. (1994). The native languages of South America. In C. Mosley & R. E. Asher (Eds.), Atlas of the world's languages (pp. 46–76). London: Routledge.
 Landaburu, J. (1979). La Langue des Andoke (Grammaire Colombienne). (Langues et Civilisations a Tradition Orale, 36). Paris: SELAF.

External links

Alain Fabre, 2005, Diccionario etnolingüístico y guía bibliográfica de los pueblos indígenas sudamericanos: ANDOKE
 Andoke Collection of Jon Landaburu at the Archive of the Indigenous Languages of Latin America

Languages of Colombia
Andoque–Urequena languages
Indigenous languages of the South American Northwest
Endangered indigenous languages of the Americas